Ernest Gayhart Ovitz (October 7, 1885 – September 11, 1980) was a pitcher in Major League Baseball. He played for the Chicago Cubs in 1911.

References

External links

1885 births
1980 deaths
People from Mineral Point, Wisconsin
Major League Baseball pitchers
Chicago Cubs players
Baseball players from Wisconsin
Dubuque Dubs players
Grays Harbor Grays players
Peoria Distillers players